Passive heave compensation is a technique used to reduce the influence of waves upon lifting and drilling operations. A simple passive heave compensator (PHC) is a soft spring which utilizes spring isolation to reduce transmissibility to less than 1. PHC differs from AHC by not consuming external power.

Principle
The main principle in PHC is to store the energy from the external forces (waves) influencing the system and dissipate them or reapply them later. Shock absorbers or drill string compensators are simple forms of PHC, so simple that they are normally named heave compensators, while "passive" is used about more sophisticated hydraulic or mechanical systems.

A typical PHC device consists of a hydraulic cylinder and a gas accumulator. When the piston rod extends it will reduce the total gas volume and hence compress the gas that in turn increases the pressure acting upon the piston. The compression ratio is low to ensure low stiffness. A well designed PHC device can achieve efficiencies above 80 percent.

Application
PHC is often used on offshore equipment that is at or linked to the seabed. Not requiring external energy, PHC may be designed as a fail-safe system reducing the wave impact on sub-sea operations. PHC may be used along with active heave compensation to form a semi-active system.

Calculation of PHC

Efficiency for a PHC used during offshore lifting operations

The PHC device is in this calculation connected to the crane hook. Newton's second law is used to describe the acceleration of the payload:

Where
 - is the mass of the load underneath the PHC device
 - is the added mass of the load underneath the PHC device
 - is the acceleration of the mass of the load underneath the PHC device
 - is the stiffness of the PHC device
 - is the vertical position of the mass underneath the PHC device
 - is the vessel motion amplitude
 - is the angular wave frequency
 - is time

If we ignore the transient solution we will find that the ratio between the amplitude of the load and the wave amplitude is:

To simplify the expression it is common to introduce  as the systems natural frequency, defined as:

We then get the following expression for the ratio:

The transmissibility  is defined as:

Finally the efficiency is defined as:

Calculating PHC stiffness
The stiffness of a PHC device is given by:

Where
 - is the gas pressure at equilibrium stroke
 - is the piston area
 - is the stroke length
 - is the compression ratio
 - is the adiabatic coefficient

The product  corresponds to the submerged weight of the payload. As can be seen from the expression it is clear that low compression ratios as well as long stroke length gives low stiffness.

References

Springs (mechanical)
Petroleum production
Lifting equipment